Buttree Puedpong (born October 16, 1990; nicknamed Song which means "two") is a female Thai Taekwondo practitioner who competes at the 2008 Summer Olympics in the -49 kg class. She graduate Bachelor of Social Sciences from Kasetsart.

References

External links
 
 

1990 births
Living people
Buttree Puedpong
Buttree Puedpong
Taekwondo practitioners at the 2008 Summer Olympics
Buttree Puedpong
Olympic medalists in taekwondo
Taekwondo practitioners at the 2010 Asian Games
Medalists at the 2008 Summer Olympics
Buttree Puedpong
Southeast Asian Games medalists in taekwondo
Competitors at the 2007 Southeast Asian Games
Buttree Puedpong
World Taekwondo Championships medalists
Buttree Puedpong